Saros cycle series 147 for solar eclipses occurs at the Moon's ascending node, repeating every 18 years, 11 days, containing 80 events. All eclipses in this series occurs at the Moon's ascending node.

This solar saros is linked to Lunar Saros 140.

Umbral eclipses
Umbral eclipses (annular, total and hybrid) can be further classified as either: 1) Central (two limits), 2) Central (one limit) or 3) Non-Central (one limit). The statistical distribution of these classes in Saros series 147 appears in the following table.

Solar Saros 147 
Solar Saros 147, repeats every 18 years, 11 and 1/3 days, and contains 80 events in which 40 will be partial eclipses and 40 will be annular. There are no total or hybrid eclipses in this series. It includes 25 central solar eclipses with a penumbral internal contact (penumbra northern and southern limits), starting in 2129 and ending in 2562. Lunar Saros 140 interleaves with this solar saros with an event occurring every 9 years 5 days alternating between each saros series.

Events

References 
 http://eclipse.gsfc.nasa.gov/SEsaros/SEsaros147.html

External links
Saros cycle 147 - Information and visualization

Solar saros series